Euchilichthys guentheri is a species of upside-down catfish native to the Congo Basin of the Democratic Republic of the Congo, the Republic of the Congo and Zambia.  This species grows to a length of  TL.

References
 
 

Mochokidae
Catfish of Africa
Fish of the Democratic Republic of the Congo
Fish of the Republic of the Congo
Fish of Zambia
Fish described in 1891